John O'Mahony (born 7 December 1931) was  a former Australian rules footballer who played with Hawthorn in the Victorian Football League (VFL).  He stayed with the club after retirement, first serving as an assistant coach, and later as the chairman of selectors. His grandson, Jarryd Blair, would later play for Collingwood

Honours and achievements 
Individual
 Hawthorn Hall of Fame
 Hawthorn life member

Notes

External links 		

1931 births
Australian rules footballers from Victoria (Australia)
Hawthorn Football Club players
Hawthorn Football Club administrators
Living people